This is a list of films and TV productions made at Elstree Studios in Shenley Road, Borehamwood. Some dates represent production dates, rather than release dates.

List

1927

1928

1929

1930
All Elstree Studios films in 1930 were produced by British International Pictures.

1931
All Elstree Studios films in 1931 were produced by British International Pictures.

1932
All Elstree Studios films in 1932 were produced by British International Pictures.

1933
All Elstree Studios films in 1933 were produced by British International Pictures.

{| class="wikitable unsortable"
! Title !! Type !! Genre !! Director !! Starring 
|-
| Anne One Hundred || rowspan="9" | Film || Drama || Henry Edwards  || Betty Stockfeld, Gyles Isham, Dennis Wyndham
|-
| Ask Beccles || Comedy crime || Redd Davis || Garry Marsh, Lilian Oldland, Abraham Sofaer
|-
| The Blarney Stone || rowspan="2" | Comedy || Tom Walls || Anne Grey, Robert Douglas, Zoe Palmer, Peter Gawthorne
|-
| Cash || Zoltan Korda || Edmund Gwenn, Wendy Barrie, Robert Donat
|-
| Counsel's Opinion || Romantic comedy || Allan Dwan || Henry Kendall, Binnie Barnes
|-
| The Crime at Blossoms || Crime || Maclean Rogers || Hugh Wakefield, Joyce Bland, Eileen Munro
|-
| Crime on the Hill || Mystery || Bernard Vorhaus || Sally Blane, Nigel Playfair, Lewis Casson
|-
| Discord  || Drama || Henry Edwards || Owen Nares, Benita Hume, Harold Huth
|-
| Facing the Music || Musical comedy || Harry Hughes || Stanley Lupino, Jose Collins, Nancy Burne
|-
| The Feather Bed: A Mrs. Feather Dilemma || Short film || Comedy || J. Bertram Fryer || Jeanne de Casalis, Gus McNaughton
|-
| For Love of You || rowspan="40" | Film || Musical comedy || Carmine Gallone || Arthur Riscoe, Naunton Wayne, Franco Foresta
|-
| General John Regan || Comedy || Henry Edwards || Henry Edwards, Chrissie White, Ben Welden
|-
| Going Gay || rowspan="2" | Musical || Carmine Gallone || Arthur Riscoe, Naunton Wayne, Magda Schneider
|-
| Happy || Frederic Zelnik || Stanley Lupino, Dorothy Hyson, Laddie Cliff, Will Fyffe
|-
| Hawley's of High Street || rowspan="2" | Comedy || Thomas Bentley || Leslie Fuller, Judy Kelly, Francis Lister, Moore Mariott
|-
| Heads We Go || Monty Banks || Constance Cummings, Frank Lawton, Binnie Barnes
|-
| I Was a Spy || Thriller || Victor Saville || Madeleine Carroll, Herbert Marshall, Conrad Veidt
|-
| It's a King || rowspan="4" | Comedy || Jack Raymond || Sydney Howard, Joan Maude, Cecil Humphreys
|-
| Just My Luck || Jack Raymond || Ralph Lynn, Winifred Shotter, Davy Burnaby, Robertson Hare
|-
| The King's Cup || Donald Macardle, Herbert Wilcox, Robert Cullen || Chili Bouchier, Harry Milton, William Kendall
|-
| Leave It to Me || Monty Banks || Gene Gerrard, Olive Borden, Molly Lamont
|-
| Letting in the Sunshine || Comedy crime || Lupino Lane || Albert Burdon, Renee Gadd, Molly Lamont
|-
| The Little Damozel || Romance || Herbert Wilcox || Anna Neagle, James Rennie, Benita Hume
|-
| Lord of the Manor || rowspan="2" | Comedy || Henry Edwards || Betty Stockfeld, Frederick Kerr, Henry Wilcoxon
|-
| The Love Nest || Thomas Bentley || Gene Gerrard, Camilla Horn, Nancy Burne
|-
| Maid Happy || Musical || Mansfield Markham || Charlotte Ander, Johannes Riemann, Dennis Hoey
|-
| Men of Tomorrow || Drama || Zoltan Korda, Leontine Sagan || Maurice Braddell, Joan Gardner, Emlyn Williams
|-
| Mixed Doubles || rowspan="2" | Comedy || Sidney Morgan || Jeanne De Casalis, Frederick Lloyd, Cyril Raymond
|-
| Night of the Garter || Jack Raymond || Sydney Howard, Winifred Shotter, Elsie Randolph
|-
| No Funny Business || || Victor Hanbury, John Stafford || Laurence Olivier, Gertrude Lawrence, Jill Esmond
|-
| On Secret Service || Thriller || Arthur B. Woods || Greta Nissen, Karl Ludwig Diehl, Don Alvarado, Austin Trevor
|-
| One Precious Year || Drama || Henry Edwards || Anne Grey, Basil Rathbone, Owen Nares
|-
| The Pride of the Force || Comedy || Norman Lee || Leslie Fuller, Patrick Aherne, Faith Bennett, Hal Gordon
|-
| The Private Life of Henry VIII || || Alexander Korda || Charles Laughton, Binnie Barnes, Robert Donat
|-
| Radio Parade || Comedy || Richard Beville, Archie de Bear || Jeanne de Casalis, Florence Desmond
|-
| Red Wagon || Drama || Paul L. Stein || Charles Bickford, Anthony Bushell, Greta Nissen
|-
| Send 'em Back Half Dead || Comedy || Redd Davis || Nelson Keys, Polly Luce, Ben Welden
|-
| The Song You Gave Me || rowspan="2" | Musical || Paul L. Stein || Bebe Daniels, Victor Varconi, Frederick Lloyd 
|-
| A Southern Maid || Harry Hughes || Bebe Daniels, Clifford Mollison, Hal Gordon
|-
| Strange Evidence || Crime || Robert Milton || Leslie Banks, Carol Goodner, George Curzon
|-
| That's a Good Girl || rowspan="3" | Comedy || Jack Buchanan || Jack Buchanan, Elsie Randolph, Dorothy Hyson
|-
| Their Night Out || Harry Hughes || Claude Hulbert, Renée Houston, Gus McNaughton
|-
| Trouble || Maclean Rogers || Sydney Howard, George Curzon, Dorothy Robinson 
|-
| Purse Strings || || Henry Edwards || Chili Bouchier, Gyles Isham, Allan Jeayes
|-
| Summer Lightning || Comedy || Maclean Rogers || Ralph Lynn, Winifred Shotter, Chili Bouchier
|-
| Timbuctoo |||| Walter Summers, Arthur B. Woods || Henry Kendall, Margot Grahame
|-
| Up for the Derby || Sports comedy || Maclean Rogers || Sydney Howard, Dorothy Bartlam, Tom Helmore
|-
| Up to the Neck || Comedy || Jack Raymond || Ralph Lynn, Winifred Shotter, Francis Lister
|-
| Yes, Mr Brown || Musical comedy || Herbert Wilcox || Jack Buchanan, Hartley Power, Elsie Randolph, Margot Grahame
|-
| You Made Me Love You || || Monty Banks || Stanley Lupino, Thelma Todd, John Loder
|}

1934
All Elstree Studios films in 1934 were produced by British International Pictures.

{| class="wikitable unsortable"
! Title !! Type !! Genre !! Director !! Starring 
|-
| Badger's Green || rowspan="43" | Film || || Adrian Brunel || Valerie Hobson, Bruce Lester, David Horne, Sebastian Smith
|-
| Blossom Time || Musical drama || Paul L. Stein || Richard Tauber, Jane Baxter, Carl Esmond
|-
| Brides to Be || Comedy || Reginald Denham || Betty Stockfeld, Constance Shotter, Ronald Ward
|-
| The Case for the Crown || Crime || George A. Cooper || Miles Mander, Meriel Forbes, Whitmore Humphries
|-
| Dangerous Ground || Mystery || Norman Walker || Malcolm Keen, Jack Raine, Joyce Kennedy
|-
| Doctor's Orders || rowspan="2" | Comedy || Norman Lee || Leslie Fuller, John Mills, Marguerite Allan
|-
| Easy Money || Redd Davis || Lilian Oldland, Gerald Rawlinson, George Carney
|-
| Freedom of the Seas || War comedy || Marcel Varnel || Clifford Mollison, Wendy Barrie, Zelma O'Neal
|-
| Get Your Man || Comedy || George King || Dorothy Boyd, Sebastian Shaw, Clifford Heatherley
|-
| The Girl in the Flat || Crime || Redd Davis || Stewart Rome, Belle Chrystall, Vera Bogetti, Noel Shannon
|-
| Girls, Please! || Comedy || Jack Raymond || Sydney Howard, Jane Baxter, Meriel Forbes, Peter Gawthorne
|-
| Give Her a Ring || Musical || Arthur B. Woods || Clifford Mollison, Wendy Barrie, Zelma O'Neal
|-
| Girls Will Be Boys || Comedy || Marcel Varnel || Dolly Haas, Cyril Maude, Esmond Knight
|-
| I Spy || Drama || Allan Dwan || Sally Eilers, Ben Lyon
|-
| It's a Cop || Comedy || Maclean Rogers || Sydney Howard, Chili Bouchier, Garry Marsh
|-
| The King of Paris || Drama || Jack Raymond || Cedric Hardwicke, Marie Glory, Ralph Richardson
|-
| The Lady Is Willing || Comedy || Gilbert Miller || Leslie Howard
|-
| Lilies of the Field || Romantic comedy || Norman Walker || Winifred Shotter, Ellis Jeffreys, Anthony Bushell, Claude Hulbert
|-
| Lost in the Legion || Comedy || Fred Newmeyer || Leslie Fuller, Hal Gordon, Renée Houston
|-
| Love at Second Sight''' || Romantic comedy || Paul Merzbach || Marian Marsh, Anthony Bushell, Claude Hulbert
|-
| The Luck of a Sailor || Romance || Robert Milton || Greta Nissen, David Manners, Clifford Mollison
|-
| Lucky Loser || rowspan="3" | Comedy || Reginald Denham || Richard Dolman, Aileen Marson, Anna Lee
|-
| Master and Man  || John Harlow || Wallace Lupino, Barry Lupino, Gus McNaughton
|-
| My Old Duchess || Lupino Lane || George Lacy, Betty Ann Davies, Dennis Hoey
|-
| My Song Goes Round the World || Musical || Richard Oswald || Joseph Schmidt, John Loder, Charlotte Ander
|-
| Nell Gwynn || Historical drama || Herbert Wilcox || Anna Neagle, Cedric Hardwicke, Jeanne de Casalis, Miles Malleson, Moore Marriott
|-
| The Old Curiosity Shop || Drama || Thomas Bentley || Elaine Benson, Ben Webster, Hay Petrie
|-
| The Outcast || Comedy crime || Norman Lee || Leslie Fuller, Mary Glynne, Hal Gordon
|-
| Over the Garden Wall || Musical romantic comedy || John Daumery || Bobby Howes, Marian Marsh, Margaret Bannerman, Viola Lyel
|-
| A Political Party || || Norman Lee || Leslie Fuller, John Mills, Enid Stamp-Taylor, Viola Lyel
|-
| The Primrose Path || Romance || Reginald Denham || Isobel Elsom, Whitmore Humphries, Max Adrian
|-
| The Private Life of Don Juan || Dramedy || Alexander Korda || Douglas Fairbanks, Merle Oberon, Benita Hume
|-
| The Queen's Affair || Musical || Herbert Wilcox || Anna Neagle, Fernand Gravey, Muriel Aked, Edward Chapman
|-
| Radio Parade of 1935 || || Arthur B. Woods || Will Hay, Clifford Mollison, Helen Chandler
|-
| The Rise of Catherine the Great || Historical || Paul Czinner || Elisabeth Bergner, Douglas Fairbanks Jr., Flora Robson
|-
| The Scarlet Pimpernel || Adventure || Harold Young || Leslie Howard, Merle Oberon, Raymond Massey
|-
| The Scoop || rowspan="2" | Crime || Maclean Rogers || Anne Grey, Tom Helmore, Wally Patch
|-
| The Scotland Yard Mystery || Thomas Bentley || Gerald du Maurier, George Curzon, Grete Natzler, Belle Chrystall, Wally Patch
|-
| Seeing Is Believing || Comedy crime || Redd Davis || William Hartnell, Gus McNaughton, Faith Bennett
|-
| Sorrell and Son || Drama || Jack Raymond || H. B. Warner, Margot Grahame, Peter Penrose, Hugh Williams, Winifred Shotter
|-
| Spring in the Air || rowspan="2" | Comedy || Victor Hanbury, Norman Lee || Edmund Gwenn, Zelma O'Neal, Theo Shall
|-
| Those Were the Days || Thomas Bentley || Will Hay, Iris Hoey, Angela Baddeley
|-
| The Warren Case || Crime || Walter Summers || Richard Bird, Nancy Burne, Diana Napier
|-
| Wishes  || Short film || Dramedy || W. P. Kellino || Wallace Lupino, Barry Lupino, Hal Gordon, Gus McNaughton
|}

1935
All Elstree Studios films in 1935 were produced by British International Pictures.

1936
All Elstree Studios films in 1936 were produced by British International Pictures.

1937

1938

1939

1940

1941

1942

1943—1944

1945

1946—1948
Elstree was closed during this time, as the Royal Army Ordinance Corps used it as a depot during World War II.

1949
Film

Television

1950

1951
Film

Television

1952

1953

1954

1955
Film

Television

1956
Film

Television

1957
Film

Television

1958
Film

Television

1959
Film

Television

1960

1961
Film

Television

1962
Film

Television

1963
Films

Television

1964
Film

Television

1965
Film

1966
Film

Television

1967

1968
Film

Television

1969
Film

Television

1970
Film

Television

1971
Film

1972
Film

Television

1973
Film

1974

1975

1976

1977

1978
Film

Television

1979
Film

Television

1980
Film

Television

1981

1982

1983

Television

1984
Film
{| class="wikitable unsortable"
! Title !! Genre !! Company !! Director !! Starring 
|-
| Cal || Drama || Goldcrest || Pat O'Connor || John Lynch, Helen Mirren
|-
| Give My Regards to Broad Street || Musical || MPL || Peter Webb || Paul McCartney, Bryan Brown, Ringo Starr
|-
| Greystoke: The Legend of Tarzan, Lord of the Apes || Adventure || Warner Bros., Edgar Rice Burroughs, Inc., WEA Records || Hugh Hudson || Ralph Richardson, Ian Holm, James Fox, Christopher Lambert, Andie MacDowell
|-
| Indiana Jones and the Temple of Doom || Action-adventure || Lucasfilm || Steven Spielberg || Harrison Ford, Kate Capshaw, Amrish Puri, Roshan Seth, Philip Stone, Ke Huy Quan
|-
| Kim || Adventure || London Films || John Davies || Peter O'Toole, Bryan Brown, John Rhys-Davies, Nadira, Julian Glover, Jalal Agha, Raj Kapoor, Ravi Sheth
|-
| Plenty || Drama || Pressman Corp, RKO || Fred Schepisi || Meryl Streep, Charles Dance, Tracey Ullman, John Gielgud, Sting, Ian McKellen, Sam Neill
|-
| The Razor's Edge || Drama || Columbia Pictures, Colgems Productions Ltd., Marcucci-Cohen-Benn Production || John Byrum || Bill Murray, Theresa Russell, Catherine Hicks, Denholm Elliott, Brian Doyle-Murray, James Keach
|-
|}

Television
f

1985
Film

Television

1986
Film

Television

1987
Film

Television

1988
Film

Television

1989
Film

Television

1990
Film

Television

1991
Film

Television

1992

Film

Television

1993

1994
Film

Television

1995
Television

1996

1997
Film

Television

1998
Film

Television

1999
Film

Television

2000
Film

Television

2001
Film

Television

2002
Film

Television

2003
Film

Television

2004
Film

Television

2005
Film

Television

2006
Film

Television

2007
Film

Television

2008

2009
Film

Television

2010
Film

Television

2011
Film

Television

2012
Film

Television

2013
Film

Television

2014
Film

Television

2015
Film

Television

2016
Film

Television

2017
Film

Television

2018
Film

Television

2019
Film

Television

2020

2021

See also
 Lists of productions shot at the other Elstree studios:
 List of films and television shows shot at Clarendon Road Studios
 
 
 List of films shot at MGM-British Studios, Elstree
 

References

Bibliography
Warren, Patricia (1983). Elstree: The British Hollywood''. Publisher: Columbus Books, London, .

External links
"Elstree Studios" @ The Internet Movie Database (IMDb)
Elstree Studios film and TV archive

 List of Elstree Studios productions
Lists of British films
Elstree Studios
 List of films and television shows shot at Elstree Studios